Sauka Parish is an administrative unit of Jēkabpils Municipality in the Selonia region of Latvia. Prior to 2009, it was an administrative unit of the former Jēkabpils District. The administrative center is  village.

Towns, villages and settlements of Sauka parish 
 Brieži
 Galvāni
  - parish administrative center
 Sauka

See also 
 Pauls Dauge

References

External links

Parishes of Latvia
Jēkabpils Municipality
Selonia